Naoki Matsushita  (born March 31, 1976) is a Japanese mixed martial artist. He competed in the Lightweight division.

Mixed martial arts record

|-
| Loss
| align=center| 12-16-11
| Yusuke Tsunoda
| KO (Punch)
| Deep: Nagoya Impact 2012: Kobudo Fight
| 
| align=center| 1
| align=center| 2:06
| Nagoya, Japan
| 
|-
| Draw
| align=center| 12-15-11
| Yutaka Ueda
| Draw
| Deep: Cage Impact 2011 in Nagoya
| 
| align=center| 2
| align=center| 5:00
| Nagoya, Japan
| 
|-
| Loss
| align=center| 12-15-10
| Sadao Kondo
| KO (Punches)
| Deep: clubDeep Nagoya: Kobudo Fight 2
| 
| align=center| 2
| align=center| 1:21
| Nagoya, Japan
| 
|-
| Draw
| align=center| 12-14-10
| Koji Nakamura
| Draw
| Deep: clubDeep Nagoya: Kobudo Fight
| 
| align=center| 2
| align=center| 5:00
| Nagoya, Japan
| 
|-
| Win
| align=center| 12-14-9
| Yuya Osugi
| TKO (Punches)
| Deep: Cage Impact in Nagoya
| 
| align=center| 1
| align=center| 2:58
| Nagoya, Japan
| 
|-
| Loss
| align=center| 11-14-9
| Seichi Ikemoto
| Decision (Majority)
| Deep: Cage Impact 2010 in Osaka
| 
| align=center| 3
| align=center| 5:00
| Osaka, Japan
| 
|-
| Loss
| align=center| 11-13-9
| Yuki Ito
| TKO (Punches)
| Deep: Cage Impact 2009
| 
| align=center| 1
| align=center| 3:05
| Tokyo, Japan
| 
|-
| Win
| align=center| 11-12-9
| Luiz Andrade I
| KO (Punch)
| Deep: Hamamatsu Impact
| 
| align=center| 2
| align=center| 4:20
| Hamamatsu, Japan
| 
|-
| Win
| align=center| 10-12-9
| Jang Yong Kim
| TKO (Punches)
| FMC 1: Korea vs. Japan
| 
| align=center| 1
| align=center| 2:10
| Seoul, South Korea
| 
|-
| Loss
| align=center| 9-12-9
| Yasuaki Kishimoto
| Decision (Majority)
| Deep: Nagoya Impact
| 
| align=center| 2
| align=center| 5:00
| Nagoya, Japan
| 
|-
| Loss
| align=center| 9-11-9
| Won Sik Park
| TKO (Doctor Stoppage)
| Deep: 41 Impact
| 
| align=center| 1
| align=center| 3:59
| Tokyo, Japan
| 
|-
| Loss
| align=center| 9-10-9
| Ryan Bow
| Decision (Unanimous)
| Deep: clubDeep Nagoya: MB3z Impact, All Stand Up
| 
| align=center| 3
| align=center| 5:00
| Nagoya, Japan
| 
|-
| Draw
| align=center| 9-9-9
| Ryan Bow
| Draw
| Deep: clubDeep Tokyo
| 
| align=center| 2
| align=center| 5:00
| Tokyo, Japan
| 
|-
| Loss
| align=center| 9-9-8
| Yukinari Tamura
| TKO (Doctor Stoppage)
| Deep: Protect Impact 2007
| 
| align=center| 2
| align=center| 3:46
| Osaka, Japan
| 
|-
| Loss
| align=center| 9-8-8
| Tae Hyun Bang
| Decision (Unanimous)
| Deep: CMA Festival 2
| 
| align=center| 2
| align=center| 5:00
| Tokyo, Japan
| 
|-
| Win
| align=center| 9-7-8
| Edison Salman Mishio
| Decision (Unanimous)
| Deep: clubDeep Nagoya: MB3z Impact, Power of a Dream
| 
| align=center| 2
| align=center| 5:00
| Nagoya, Japan
| 
|-
| Loss
| align=center| 8-7-8
| Michihiro Omigawa
| TKO (Punches)
| Deep: 29 Impact
| 
| align=center| 2
| align=center| 1:17
| Tokyo, Japan
| 
|-
| Draw
| align=center| 8-6-8
| Hiroyuki Abe
| Draw
| Pride Bushido 12
| 
| align=center| 2
| align=center| 5:00
| Nagoya, Japan
| 
|-
| Loss
| align=center| 8-6-7
| Seichi Ikemoto
| TKO (Doctor Stoppage)
| Real Rhythm: 4th Stage
| 
| align=center| 1
| align=center| 2:26
| Osaka, Japan
| 
|-
| Win
| align=center| 8-5-7
| Hiroki Nagaoka
| TKO (Punches)
| Deep: clubDeep Nagoya: MB3z Impact, Di Entrare
| 
| align=center| 2
| align=center| 0:19
| Nagoya, Japan
| 
|-
| Loss
| align=center| 7-5-7
| Jin Kazeta
| TKO (Punches)
| Shooto: Gig Central 9
| 
| align=center| 1
| align=center| 4:54
| Nagoya, Aichi, Japan
| 
|-
| Win
| align=center| 7-4-7
| Takahito Iida
| KO (Punch)
| GCM: D.O.G. 4
| 
| align=center| 2
| align=center| 3:28
| Tokyo, Japan
| 
|-
| Win
| align=center| 6-4-7
| Yuichi Ikari
| Decision (Unanimous)
| Deep: clubDeep Toyama: Barbarian Festival 3
| 
| align=center| 2
| align=center| 5:00
| Toyama, Japan
| 
|-
| Loss
| align=center| 5-4-7
| Yoshihiro Tomioka
| TKO (Punches)
| Deep: 19th Impact
| 
| align=center| 2
| align=center| 0:33
| Tokyo, Japan
| 
|-
| Win
| align=center| 5-3-7
| Ken Omatsu
| Decision (Unanimous)
| Shooto: Gig Central 7
| 
| align=center| 2
| align=center| 5:00
| Nagoya, Aichi, Japan
| 
|-
| Draw
| align=center| 4-3-7
| Tomoyuki Fukami
| Draw
| Deep: clubDeep Osaka
| 
| align=center| 2
| align=center| 5:00
| Osaka, Japan
| 
|-
| Draw
| align=center| 4-3-6
| Tashiro Nishiuchi
| Draw
| Deep: clubDeep Toyama: Barbarian Festival 1
| 
| align=center| 2
| align=center| 5:00
| Toyama, Japan
| 
|-
| Draw
| align=center| 4-3-5
| Takahito Iida
| Draw
| GCM: Demolition 040919
| 
| align=center| 2
| align=center| 5:00
| Tokyo, Japan
| 
|-
| Loss
| align=center| 4-3-4
| Ganjo Tentsuku
| Decision (Majority)
| Shooto: Gig Central 5
| 
| align=center| 2
| align=center| 5:00
| Nagoya, Aichi, Japan
| 
|-
| Loss
| align=center| 4-2-4
| Kotetsu Boku
| TKO (Punches)
| Shooto: Gig Central 4
| 
| align=center| 2
| align=center| 1:15
| Nagoya, Aichi, Japan
| 
|-
| Draw
| align=center| 4-1-4
| Mitsuhiro Ishida
| Draw
| Shooto: 7/13 in Korakuen Hall
| 
| align=center| 2
| align=center| 5:00
| Tokyo, Japan
| 
|-
| Win
| align=center| 4-1-3
| Masato Fujiwara
| Decision (Unanimous)
| Shooto: Gig Central 3
| 
| align=center| 2
| align=center| 5:00
| Nagoya, Aichi, Japan
| 
|-
| Win
| align=center| 3-1-3
| Yohei Suzuki
| Decision (Unanimous)
| Shooto: Gig Central 2
| 
| align=center| 2
| align=center| 5:00
| Nagoya, Aichi, Japan
| 
|-
| Draw
| align=center| 2-1-3
| Masato Fujiwara
| Draw
| Shooto: Gig East 10
| 
| align=center| 2
| align=center| 5:00
| Tokyo, Japan
| 
|-
| Win
| align=center| 2-1-2
| Takayuki Okochi
| Decision (Majority)
| Shooto: Gig Central 1
| 
| align=center| 2
| align=center| 5:00
| Nagoya, Aichi, Japan
| 
|-
| Draw
| align=center| 1-1-2
| Tsutomu Shiiki
| Draw
| Shooto: Treasure Hunt 3
| 
| align=center| 2
| align=center| 5:00
| Kobe, Hyogo, Japan
| 
|-
| Draw
| align=center| 1-1-1
| Kenichiro Togashi
| Draw
| Shooto: To The Top 10
| 
| align=center| 2
| align=center| 5:00
| Tokyo, Japan
| 
|-
| Loss
| align=center| 1-1
| Naoto Kojima
| Decision (Unanimous)
| Shooto: Gig East 5
| 
| align=center| 2
| align=center| 5:00
| Tokyo, Japan
| 
|-
| Win
| align=center| 1-0
| Takuhito Hida
| Decision (Unanimous)
| Shooto: Gig East 3
| 
| align=center| 2
| align=center| 5:00
| Tokyo, Japan
|

See also
List of male mixed martial artists

References

External links
 
 
 

1976 births
Japanese male mixed martial artists
Lightweight mixed martial artists
Living people